The Moscow Federation of Anarchist Groups (MFAG) was a network of anarchist groups established in Moscow in 1917. They occupied the Merchants' House shortly after the February Revolution. They published Anarkhiia, weekly after its launch in September 1917 and then as a daily from March 1918. Following the October Revolution of November 1917, they were involved in the development of the Black Guards into a significant military force in Moscow. On 3 March 1918 the Bolsheviks signed the Brest-Litovsk Treaty, which precipitated a political crisis with their erstwhile allies amongst the Anarchists and Left Socialist Revolutionaries. On 12 April, 1918 the Bolshevik authorities moved against the Anarchists: 26 centres were raided in Moscow, forty anarchists were killed and over 500 were arrested.

Lev Chernyi was the secretary of MFAG.

References

1917 establishments in Russia
1918 disestablishments in Russia
Anarchist organizations in Russia
Organizations of the Russian Revolution
Organizations disestablished in 1918
Organizations established in 1917